Brownsburg is an unincorporated community in Rockbridge County, Virginia, United States.

The Brownsburg Historic District, Hays Creek Mill, Kennedy-Wade Mill, Level Loop, Mulberry Grove, and New Providence Presbyterian Church are listed on the National Register of Historic Places.

References

Unincorporated communities in Rockbridge County, Virginia
Unincorporated communities in Virginia
Populated places established in 1793